Serbian identity card (Serbian: Лична карта / Lična karta) is the national identification card used in Serbia. Though the ID card is a primary photo ID, Serbian passport and national Drivers license are used as valid photo IDs for various purposes. It is issued to all Serbian citizens residing in the country above 10 years of age and compulsory for those over the age of 16.

Appearance 

ID card has the same shape and size as many other ID cards, as specified by the ISO/IEC 7810 standard. It features a light red and blue background, colors of the Serbian flag. Obverse background has a picture of the Mother Serbia statue on the top of the Serbian government building in Belgrade, while the reverse has the small Serbian coat of arms.

In the chipped card, language used on the form is Serbian (in Cyrillic script) and English, however, personal data is printed only in Serbian Cyrillic. This has caused some controversy, since obviously national ID card will be difficult to use as a valid ID document abroad, except in those countries which also use Cyrillic script. Nevertheless, the chip-less version of the ID card uses Latin and Cyrillic scripts and has the holder's name printed in Latin script. This was done probably due to the fact that the name of the ID card holder is stored in Latin script inside the chip of a chipped card.

Serbian citizens who are members of a national minority have the option to have the form of their ID card printed in Serbian, English and their native language (or Serbian Latin), while personal data will be entered in native language (for example, for Serbian Hungarians, in Latin script Hungarian alphabet, instead of the Serbian Cyrillic). Citizens whose native language is Serbian can opt to have their name and surname entered in Serbian Latin, instead of Cyrillic script; however, ID card form will still be in Serbian Cyrillic and English only, as Serbian Latin and Serbian Cyrillic are not considered different languages.

ID card includes the following data:

Презиме / Surname
Име / Given name
Датум рођења / Date of birth
Пол / Sex
Рег. бр. / Reg No
Датум издавања / Issuing date
Важи до / Valid until
Документ издаје / Issuing authority
ЈМБГ / JMBG
Држава рођења / State of birth
Место и општина рођења / Place of birth
Пребивалиште и адреса стана / Place of residence (not included on the biometric ID cards)

Bearers signature and fingerprint of the right index finger are also printed on the ID card.

Validity of the document is ten years (five for minors) from the date of handing in the application, while processing time is up to 15 days.

Announced changes

On July 1, 2013, Serbian Ministry of the Interior announced that there will be certain changes in the design and features of the ID in 2014. Among other things, there is a plan to improve the quality of the holder's photo. All new IDs will contain contact chip (until now there was a possibility of opt out for the chip) and there will also be a RFID chip incorporated in the design. The ID will be readable by passport readers and it could be programmed to contain holder's electronic signature, health insurance data, public transport subscription information, as well as, information usually contained in a driving licence. E-government portals will be made compatible with the new ID design.

Machine readable zone 
The MRZ is structured according to the ICAO standard for machine-readable ID cards.

The data of the machine readable zone consist of three lines of 30 characters each. The only characters used are those of Serbian Latin alphabet, except for letters with diacritics (ŠĐĆČŽ - they are replaced by the appropriate letter without a diacritical mark), 0-9 and the filler character <.

The format of the first row is:

The format of the second row is:

The format of the third row is:

Chip

After a long public debate, it has been decided that people will have an option to choose whether to have an ID card with or without the chip, containing the data already printed on the ID card. Those opting for the chip card do not have their place of residence (home address) printed, but it is stored in the chip. The police has provided the public with freeware software to download the data from any ID card to a computer (except for the scanned signature and the fingerprint) using a standard smart card reader. Serbian ID does not feature contactless RFID chip, so it is not a fully ICAO9303 compliant biometric travel document. About two thirds of citizens applying for the ID card opt for the chipped version.

Requirements 
To acquire the biometric ID card for the first time, a citizen must present a birth certificate and a proof of citizenship, as well as the expired old style Lična karta. In case of a renewal, only taxes should be paid and new photo will be taken at the police station.

International travel 
Serbian identity cards can be used instead of a passport for travel to some regional countries that have signed special agreements with the Serbian Government. Not all Serbian IDs feature contact-less RFID chips, so some are not fully ICAO9303 compliant biometric travel documents.

See also
Serbian passport
Serbian nationality law
Visa policy of Serbia
Visa requirements for Serbian citizens
List of identity card policies by country

Notes

References

External links
Informisanje.info - A procedure on applying for and issuing Serbian identity card (Serbian)

ID Card
Smart cards
National identity cards by country